John Thomas Shadden (born May 10, 1963 in Long Beach, California) is an American former competitive sailor and Olympic bronze medalist.

Career
At the 1988 Summer Olympics, Shadden finished in 3rd place in the 470 class along with his partner Charles McKee.

In the Snipe class, he was third at the 1980 US Nationals with Peter Frazier and was second in the Junior Nationals in 1981.

References

External links
 
 
 

1963 births
Living people
Alamitos Bay Yacht Club sailors
American male sailors (sport)
Olympic bronze medalists for the United States in sailing
Sailors at the 1988 Summer Olympics – 470
Snipe class sailors
USC Trojans sailors
Medalists at the 1988 Summer Olympics